Yuxarı Amburdərə (also, Yuxarı Ambudərə, Amburdara, Verkhnyaya Amburdarya, and Verkhnyaya Amourdara) is a village in the Lerik Rayon of Azerbaijan.  The village forms part of the municipality of Aşağı Amburdərə.

References 

Populated places in Lerik District